was a town located in Nomi District, Ishikawa Prefecture, Japan.

As of 2003, the town had an estimated population of 15,874 and a density of 1,207.15 per km². The total area was 13.15 km².

On February 1, 2005, Terai, along with the towns of Neagari and Tatsunokuchi (all from Nomi District), was merged to create the city of Nomi and no longer exists as an independent municipality.

External links
 Official website of Nomi in Japanese

Dissolved municipalities of Ishikawa Prefecture
Nomi, Ishikawa